The Windom neighborhood is located in the Southwest community of Minneapolis.  Its borders are Diamond Lake Road and West 54th Street to the north, Interstate 35W to the east, West 62nd Street (Highway 62) to the south, and Lyndale Avenue South and Highway 121 to the west.

References

Businesses

Businesses in Windom Neighborhood, Minneapolis'

External links
Minneapolis Neighborhood Profile - Windom
Windom neighborhood website
 Nicollet-East Harriet Business Association(NEHBA)
 Experience Southwest : Southwest Minneapolis Business Directory (NEHBA sponsored)

Neighborhoods in Minneapolis